The Victoria Highway links the Great Northern Highway in Western Australia with the Stuart Highway in the Northern Territory. The highway is a part of the Perth - Darwin National Highway link. It is signed as National Highway 1, and is part of Highway 1, a circular route around the country. In some areas it runs in parallel with the Northern Territory's Victoria River, from which its name originates.

History
Originally a series of unformed tracks linking pastoral holdings, the route was developed as a gravel road in the 1950s to aid the beef industry. Improvements took place in the 1960s which tied in with the development of the Ord Irrigation Scheme, which enabled the introduction of road trains. It was designated as National Highway in 1974 and was fully reconstructed and sealed to a good standard by the early 1990s. The highway serves pastoral, mining and tourism industries, as well as the Ord Irrigation Scheme agricultural development near Kununurra.

Route description
The highway is described as spectacular, with escarpment ranges, the unique boab trees and the mighty Victoria River that runs into deep valleys and spectacular gorges. Its eastern terminus is at Katherine which is renowned for Katherine Gorge. In Western Australia, the access road to the Ord River Dam which holds back Lake Argyle - Australia's largest artificial lake - begins at the Victoria Highway just west of the Western Australia / Northern Territory border. The western terminus is at Great Northern Highway, south of Wyndham, WA.

The highway connects the towns of Kununurra, Timber Creek, and Katherine

Flooding
The highway crosses Victoria River near Timber Creek, and this crossing is particularly flood-prone in the wet season. Water overtopping the bridge can cut the main Western Australia - Northern Territory link for days or even weeks during the November - April rainy period.  It is not unheard of for the bridge surface to at times be submerged below 10 metres of floodwaters. Ultimately, in May 2008 a project was done to replace the old bridge with a new one. At 7 meters (23 feet) higher, it is high enough to avoid most floods. Only an average of one-in-twenty year floods will be high enough to flood over the new bridge. Additional bridges and height increases of other sections of the highway were undertaken at the same time. As of September 2014, the new bridge has not yet been flooded over.

Major intersections

See also

 Highways in Australia
 List of highways in the Northern Territory
 List of highways in Western Australia

References

Highways in Australia
Highways in rural Western Australia
Highways in the Northern Territory
Highway 1 (Australia)
Kimberley (Western Australia)